The Bucks County Board of Commissioners is the legislative council and executive arm of Bucks County, Pennsylvania. Currently, it has 3 members.

Members of the Board of Commissioners are tasked with managing the county's budget, oversight of almost 2,400 full-time employees, and various county departments.

The current chair is Robert J. Harvie Jr., a Democrat. The Democratic Party holds a 2–1 majority over the Republican Party on the board.

Members
There are three members of the Board of Commissioners, who are elected to serve four-year terms. If there is a vacancy, the County Judges may appoint a replacement.

References 

County governing bodies in the United States
County government agencies in Pennsylvania
Bucks County, Pennsylvania
Government of Pennsylvania